The Tower Theater has been a popular venue for music acts since the 1970s. In 2018, the Tower Theater was named one of the 10 best live music venues in America by Rolling Stone magazine. Known for its acoustic properties, the venue has been used for recording live albums by many bands. It is a theater located in the Terminal Square section of Upper Darby, Pennsylvania at the intersection of 69th and Ludlow Streets. It is adjacent to 69th Street Terminal just outside of West Philadelphia.

History
The Tower Theater, built in 1927, was opened a year later, by John H. McClatchy, as one of Upper Darby Township's first movie houses. Located just outside the city limits of Philadelphia, the theater thrived in the busy area that was once the most highly traveled route to Center City from the west. In its early years, Tower Theater showed both vaudeville acts and movies.

By the 1970s, the Tower had fallen on hard times. It was then owned by the A.M. Ellis chain and showed third-run movies for $1 admission.

In 1972, after refurbishing the theater from a severe fire, Midnight Sun Concerts from northern New Jersey promoted its first concert at the Tower. The sold-out show featured Dave Mason and Buzzy Linhart on June 14. Reviewer Jonathan Takiff of the Philadelphia Daily News announced in the next day's paper that "Philly Finally Has its Fillmore", making reference to New York's famed Fillmore East. Midnight Sun's president, Rick Green, and his stage manager, Upper Darby native Billy Stevenson, were instrumental in adapting the Tower for this role. For the next three or more years, Midnight Sun's Tower concerts became the stuff of local legend. The Tower introduced America to David Bowie and The Spiders from Mars in 1972, as well as the then-unknown Genesis with Peter Gabriel that same year; Genesis played a midnight concert with a $4 admission price. In September 1974, Bruce Springsteen – who had an early, strong, and long-lived fan base in Philadelphia – introduced the world to his new E Street Band, with Max Weinberg and Roy Bittan, at the Tower Theater. It was the first time in his career that Springsteen earned $5,000 for a night's work. He returned in early November for two sold-out shows; it would still be a year before his big breakthrough with Born to Run and the attendant publicity.  Other regular Midnight Sun headliners at the Tower included Jackson Browne, Lou Reed, Steve Miller, and various editions of the Jerry Garcia/Merle Saunders band. David Bowie repaid his Philly fans by recording his 1974 David Live album during a long run of shows at the Tower. The Average White Band's live album, Person to Person, was recorded at the Tower with Atlantic Records' Arif Mardin in the production truck behind the theater. Metal acts Anthrax, Exodus and Helloween also performed at the theater during the Headbangers Ball Tour in 1989. It was not unusual at a Tower show to observe the following rock journalists huddling together during the intermission and comparing notes: David Fricke, Matt Damsker, Bill Mandel, Jon Takiff, John David Kalodner, together with Ed Sciaky and Michael Tearson from the city's progressive rock radio station WMMR. Bowie and Genesis' Phil Collins would subsequently mention their Tower shows as being instrumental in introducing them to an American audience.

In late 1975, the owners informed Midnight Sun that they were selling the theater to the promoter's much larger competitor, Electric Factory Concerts. The final Midnight Sun produced show at the Tower was 10cc, the British pop quartet, with Rory Gallagher opening, on December 5, 1975.

On the 20 and 21 October 1977 Irish rock band Thin Lizzy recorded their live album Still Dangerous which released on 2 March 2009.

A well-regarded 1980 showcase at the theater became the source for the video Paul Simon in Concert, re-released in 2003 as Live at the Tower Theatre.

The Tower Theater happened to be a popular venue for Berliner's Tangerine Dream since they played here four times on their North American tours. Dates included April 6, 1977; June 25, 1986; September 10, 1988; and October 10, 1992.

Legendary artist Prince performed at the Tower Theater on two occasions: March 13, 1982 and January 7, 1997.

A concert by Jethro Tull on November 25, 1987 was recorded for broadcast by the King Biscuit Flower Hour. On November 10, 1988, a performance by Pat Benatar was recorded by Westwood One for the "Superstar Concert Series."

By the 2000s the theater continued to be active, filling much the same role in the concert hierarchy as the Beacon Theatre in New York City.  The theater operates under the Live Nation/Electric Factory Concerts name.

On August 13, 2019, the tower on top of the venue was removed due to structural issues with the base; the ball and lettering are to be donated to a local museum. Replacement plans are under development.

See also
 House of Blues
 The Met Philadelphia
 Trocadero Theatre
 Upper Darby, Pennsylvania

References

External links

Glide Magazine profile of theater
Seating charts, photos inside the theater and info 

Culture of Philadelphia
Music venues in Philadelphia
Theatres in Pennsylvania
Buildings and structures in Delaware County, Pennsylvania
Live Nation Entertainment
Theatres completed in 1927
Tourist attractions in Delaware County, Pennsylvania